Mesnilium is a genus of parasitic alveolates belonging to the phylum Apicomplexia. Its vertebrate hosts are fish. The vectors are not presently known but are thought likely to be leeches.

Taxonomy
The genus was created in 1972 by Misra, Haldar and Chakravarty.

Description
Merogony occurs in erythrocytes and reticulo-endothelial cells. Gamogony occurs only in erythrocytes and pigment granules are present only in microgamonts and macrogametes.

Hosts
The only known host of this parasite is the freshwater murrel (Ophicephalus punctatus).

References

Haemosporida
Apicomplexa genera
Monotypic SAR supergroup genera
Parasites of fish